Waberi District is a district in the southeastern Banaadir region of Somalia. A neighborhood in southwestern Mogadishu, it flanks the Somali Sea. 

The Aden Adde International Airport is located in this district.

References
xaafiiska dowladda hoose ee Xamar wakhtigii Sareeye Guuto Xasan Maxamed Xuseen Gen.muungaab 
Districts of Somalia
Administrative map of Waberi District

External links
District Commissioner - Waberi District

Districts of Somalia
Banaadir